Niwali, Madhya Pradesh is a village & Tehsil in Barwani district in the Indian state of Madhya Pradesh.

Geography
It is a  Tehsil of Barwani district.

References

External links
 Barwani District

Barwani
Villages in Barwani district
Barwani district